Gary P. Hamel (born 1954) is an American management consultant. He is a founder of Strategos, an international management consulting firm based in Chicago.

Biography 
Hamel graduated from Andrews University in 1975, and from Ross School of Business at the University of Michigan in 1990.

Hamel has worked as a visiting professor of International Business at the University of Michigan and at Harvard Business School; he currently teaches as a visiting Professor of Strategic Management at the London Business School.

Work 
Gary Hamel is the originator (with C.K. Prahalad) of the concept of core competencies.  He is also the director of the Woodside Institute, a nonprofit research foundation based in Woodside, California.  He was a founder of the consulting firm Strategos, serving as chairman until 2003.  The UTEK Corporation acquired Strategos in 2008 in an all-stock transaction as reported by the SEC. In 2012 Strategos became an independent strategy and innovation consultancy once again through a management buy-out.

The Wall Street Journal ranked Gary Hamel as one of the world's most influential business thinkers, and Forbes magazine has called him "the world's leading expert on business strategy". In 2013, his name was not present on an updated version of the Wall Street Journal list. He is also a member of the Reliance Innovation Council formed by Reliance Industries Limited, India.

References

External links

 Official site

1954 births
Living people
American business theorists
Andrews University alumni
Ross School of Business alumni
Academics of London Business School
University of Michigan faculty
Harvard Business School faculty